
Gmina Smyków is a rural gmina (administrative district) in Końskie County, Świętokrzyskie Voivodeship, in south-central Poland.

Villages
Gmina Smyków contains the villages and settlements of Adamów, Cisownik, Kozów, Królewiec, Matyniów, Miedzierza, Przyłogi, Salata, Smyków, Stanowiska, Strażnica, Świnków, Trawniki and Wólka Smolana.

Neighbouring gminas
Gmina Smyków is bordered by the gminas of Końskie, Mniów, Radoszyce and Stąporków.

References
Polish official population figures 2006

Smykow
Końskie County